Marvelous 3 is an American rock band from Atlanta, Georgia. They are best known for their 1998 song "Freak of the Week."

History
Marvelous 3 was formed by lead singer/guitarist Butch Walker, bass guitarist Jayce Fincher, and drummer Doug Mitchell (a.k.a. Mitch "Slug" McLee.) All three band members had played together previously in glam outfit SouthGang, Floyds Funk Revival and The Floyds, before reemerging as Marvelous 3 in 1997 when they released their first album, Math and Other Problems, which would sell just over 4,000 copies by January 2000.

The band's most successful album – Hey! Album – was released in fall 1998 with the lead single "Freak of the Week" reaching No. 5 on Billboard'''s Modern Rock Tracks chart and No. 23 on the Mainstream Rock Tracks chart. The band toured with bands such as Collective Soul, SR-71, Dynamite Hack and Train and appeared on the WB television show Charmed. By 2000, Hey! Album had sold 90,000 copies in the US.

The band acrimoniously separated from label Elektra Records in spring 2001, as Walker documented on the band's official website in April 2001:

Following a final tour, in which the band headlined the Atlanta Music Midtown festival in May 2001, they ended with a final farewell show at Atlanta's Centennial Olympic Park in August 2001. By their breakup, the band's Elektra albums had sold a combined total of 133,000 copies, with their last album ReadySexGo selling 32,216 copies.

Butch Walker went on to become a successful solo artist, songwriter and record producer, creating hit records for Avril Lavigne, Bowling for Soup, Pink, Fall Out Boy, Lit and SR-71.

Marvelous 3 reunited with an advertised appearance at The Autumn Leaves benefit show on November 4, 2018 and performed a 6-song set at the end of Butch Walker's solo headlining set, after having only played together at a handful of Butch's Atlanta solo shows since 2001.

Band members
 Butch Walker – lead vocals, guitar
 Jayce Fincher – bass guitar
 Doug Mitchell (a.k.a. Mitch "Slug" McLee) – drums

Discography

Studio albums
 Math and Other Problems August 12, 1997
 Hey! Album October 27, 1998
 ReadySexGo September 12, 2000 – #196 USSingles
"Freak of the Week" from Hey! Album – #5 Alternative, #23 Mainstream Rock, #112 Billboard Hot 100
"Every Monday" from Hey! Album"Sugarbuzz" from Ready, Sex, Go"Get Over" from Ready, Sex, GoGuest appearances
Marvelous 3 have had multiple single-night reunions in Atlanta since the band's 2001 split. Most often, Fincher and McLee have joined Butch Walker during encores of his solo shows, resurrecting material from the band's three releases and prior tours.

Walker and Fincher lent background vocals to "Over Tokyo", a track from Collective Soul's 2000 album Blender''.

References

External links
 Butch Walker official website
 MTV Profile

American pop punk groups
Musical groups from Atlanta
Rock music groups from Georgia (U.S. state)
Musical groups established in 1997
Musical groups disestablished in 2001
1997 establishments in Georgia (U.S. state)
2001 disestablishments in Georgia (U.S. state)